The National Bank of Panama (BNP) is one of two Panamanian government-owned banks. As of January 2009, it held deposits of about US$5 billion. The other government-owned bank is Caja de Ahorros de Panamá (Savings Bank of Panama), with about US$1 billion in total deposits.

Panama has never had an official central bank. The National Bank of Panama was responsible for nonmonetary aspects of central banking in Panama, assisted by the National Banking Commission (Superintendencia del Mercado de Valores), which was created along with the country's International Financial Center, and was charged with licensing and supervising banks.

General managers - Gerentes generales
Albino H. Arosemena, 1904-1909
Rodolfo Chiari, 1909-1914
Francisco Mata Arosemena, 1914
Ramón Felipe Acevedo, 1914-1916
José Agustin Arango Ch., 1916-1924
Próspero Pinel, 1924-1926
Tomás Gabriel Duque, 1926
Enrique Linares, 1926-1932
Eduardo de Alba, 1932-1954
Florencio de Ycaza, 1954
Henrique de Obarrio, 1954-1960
René Orillac Arango, 1960-1964
Jorge T. Velásquez, 1964-1967
Fernando Díaz González, 1967-1969
Eduardo McCullough, 1969
Enrique Jamarillo Jr., 1969-1970
Ricardo de la Espriella, 1970 - 1978
Luis Alberto Arias, 1978 - July 1987
Rafael Arosemena, July 1987 - ?
Jose B. Espino, ? - 1988 - ?
Luis H. Moreno, 1989 - 1994
José Antonio de la Ossa, September 1994 - May 1998
Eduardo C. Urriola R., 1998 - 1999
Bolívar Pariente Castillero, September 1999 - September 2004
Juan Ricardo De Dianous, September 2004 - June 2009
Darío Ernesto Berbey De La Rosa, July 2009 - June 2014
Rolando de León de Alba, July 2014 - July 2019
Javier Carrizo Esquivel, July 2019 -

See also

Economy of Panama
Panamanian balboa

References

External links
  Banco Nacional de Panamá official website
 Banco Nacional de Panamá Deposit Trend

Banks of Panama
Panama
1911 establishments in Panama
Banks established in 1911
1904 establishments in Panama